Dylan Nahi (born 30 November 1999) is a French handball player who plays for Industria Kielce and the French national team.

Individual awards 
 All-Star Best Young Player of EHF Champions League: 2021
All-Star Team as best Left wing at the 2018 Junior European Championship

References

External links

1999 births
Living people
French male handball players
Handball players from Paris
Vive Kielce players